Kharua Rajapur is a village in Kalupur gram panchayat in Bangaon CD Block in Bangaon subdivision of North 24 Parganas district in the Indian state of West Bengal.

Geography 
The nearest railway station is Chandpara railway station at Chandpara.

Choita river flows past Kharua Rajapur.

Demographics
In the 2011 census Kharua Rajapur had a population of 1591, of which 813 were males and 778 were females. Children age 0-6 number 151. The literacy rate is 89.93.

Education 

One higher secondary school  and two primary schools operate in Kharua Rajapur:

 Kharua Rajapur High School (H.S)

G.R.F.P Primary School
S.S.K.M Primary School

References

Villages in North 24 Parganas district